Salganda (Salgandu) is a rural locality (a selo) in Paspaulskoye Rural Settlement of Choysky District, the Altai Republic, Russia. The population was 31 as of 2016. There are 7 streets.

Geography 
The village is located east from Gorno-Altaysk, in the valley of the Malaya Isha River at the confluence of the Salganda and Urgun rivers, 29 km southwest of Choya (the district's administrative centre) by road. Kara-Torbok is the nearest rural locality.

References 

Rural localities in Choysky District